Mount Khalatsa or Khalaskhokh (literally: "frost mount") is the highest point of South Ossetia, a disputed region in Georgia, with an altitude of 3,938 metres (12,920 ft). It is located on the border between South Ossetia and North Ossetia–Alania, a Russian autonomous republic.

See also
 Geography of Georgia (country)
 List of countries by highest point (Countries with disputed sovereignty)

References

Mountains of Georgia (country)
Mountains of South Ossetia
Mountains of North Ossetia–Alania
International mountains of Europe
Georgia (country)–Russia border